North Creek may refer to:
 North Creek (Toronto), formerly a small creek, now buried, in Toronto, Ontario
 North Creek (Lake Erie), a tributary that joins Big Creek (Lake Erie), at Delhi, Ontario
 North Creek, New York, a hamlet in Johnsburg, Warren County, New York, United States
 North Creek Railroad Station Complex, a historic railroad station complex at North Creek, Warren County, New York
 North Creek (West Canada Creek tributary), in Herkimer County, New York
 North Creek, Ohio, an unincorporated community
 North Creek (South Dakota), a stream in South Dakota
 North Creek (conservation area), a wildland in western Virginia
 North Creek, Wisconsin, an unincorporated community in Arcadia, Trempealeau County, Wisconsin, United States
 North Creek (Southern California), a river of California

See also
 North Creek Woods, woods in the Cook County Forest Preserves in Lansing, Illinois
 North Creek Bridge, a bridge over the Hudson River between Johnsburg and Chester, New York State
 North Creek Forest, a forest in Bothell, Washington
 North Creek School, a school building in Bothell, Washington 
 North Creek, Washington, a community in Bothell, Washington